Marian A. Peterson High School was a high school in Sunnyvale, California that operated from 1965 to 1981. The building is currently occupied by Marian A. Peterson Middle School, in the Santa Clara Unified School District.

The student body was absorbed by Adrian C. Wilcox High School in 1981 due to Peterson's declining student enrollment.

Notable alumni
Brian Boitano, Class of 1981, figure skater, Olympic gold medalist and two-time world champion
Bill Pecota, Class of 1977 or 1978, Major League Baseball player, Kansas City Royals, New York Mets and Atlanta Braves 1986 to 1994
Chuck Wright, Class of 1979, professional wrestler known as The Godfather
Tom Bruce, Class of 1970, swimmer in 1972 Olympics, won two medals
Amy Tan, attended for one year, author of The Joy Luck Club
Tony Anselmo, Class of 1978, voice of Donald Duck and an artist for Disney
Ben Bennett, Class of 1980, quarterback for Duke University, played in NFL, USFL, AFL and WLAF
JuJu Chang, Class of 1983, host on ABC television's Good Morning America
Bill Hare, Grammy-Award Winning recording engineer and producer

References

High schools in Santa Clara County, California
Sunnyvale, California
1981 disestablishments in California
1965 establishments in California
Educational institutions established in 1965
Educational institutions disestablished in 1981